Balduugiin "Marzan" Sharav (1869 – 1939, ; marzan = facetious), was a Mongolian painter.  

He is often credited with the introduction of modern painting styles to Mongolia, but his most famous work, One day in Mongolia, is done in a more traditional zurag style. His other well-known work includes portraits of the Bogd Khan and his queen Dondogdulam. He also painted a famed series called "A Day in Mongolia" with various landscape views and the capital city.

Gallery

References

Mongolian painters
1869 births
1939 deaths
19th-century Mongolian painters
20th-century Mongolian painters